Henryk Tomaszewski may refer to:
 Henryk Tomaszewski (mime) (1919–2001), Polish mime artist and theatre director
 Henryk Tomaszewski (poster artist) (1914–2005), Polish poster artist